Chabora was an ancient town on the Euphrates, near Nicephorion, that probably derives its name from the Chaboras river. Theophylact Simocatta mentions Ἀβορέων φρούριον, which is, according to William Smith, the same place.

References

Roman towns and cities in Syria
Populated places on the Euphrates River
Lost ancient cities and towns